Grégoire Barrère was the defending champion but lost in the final to Zizou Bergs.

Bergs won the title after defeating Barrère 4–6, 6–1, 7–6(7–5) in the final.

Seeds

Draw

Finals

Top half

Bottom half

References

External links
Main draw
Qualifying draw

Play In Challenger - 1